Everette Taylor (born June 23, 1989) is an American business executive. He is the CEO of Kickstarter since September 2022, and was CMO of Artsy, and founder of ET Enterprises which includes the marketing firm MiliSense, social media software company PopSocial, ArtX and GrowthHackers.

Early life
Taylor was born and raised in Richmond, Virginia. He attended Virginia Polytechnic University after overcoming homelessness in high school.

Career
At the age of 19 Taylor started an event marketing software company, which was sold two years later. After dropping out of college, he became the VP of marketing at software company Qualaroo, a behavioral insight survey software, which was later acquired by Xenon Ventures in 2014. While at Qualaroo, together with Sean Ellis, Taylor started GrowthHackers, which is an online growth hacking community and a software as a service (SaaS).

Taylor launched the clothing line Unity Over Self  with NFL athlete Brandian Ross in 2013, to raise money for children with autism.

Taylor founded ET Enterprises in 2018.

In 2018, he partnered with actress Zoe Saldana, to launch media platform BESE and the drug and alcohol addiction prevention app Hayver.

In September 2022, he was appointed as CEO of Kickstarter.

Recognition 
Black Enterprise Magazine named Taylor "Social media influencer of the year" in 2016.

The Root included Taylor in their Root 100 list of the most influential African Americans in 2017.

In 2017, he was named a brand ambassador for NASA's Technology Transfer Program to advocate for the commercialization of NASA technologies and introduce NASA's technology portfolio to his network.

In 2018, he made a Forbes 30 under 30 list for his work in marketing and advertising with PopSocial.

Personal life
He supports diversity and gender equality initiatives such as CODE2040, Wonder Women Tech, and Black Girls Code.

References

American business writers
Living people
1989 births
American businesspeople
Social media influencers